Cryptopone testacea, is a species of ant of the subfamily Ponerinae. It is a widespread species.

References

External links

 at antwiki.org
Animaldiversity.org
Itis.org

Ponerinae
Hymenoptera of Asia
Insects described in 1893